Branko Dolhar (born 2 February 1949) is a Slovenian ski jumper. He competed in the normal hill and large hill events at the 1976 Winter Olympics.

References

1949 births
Living people
Slovenian male ski jumpers
Olympic ski jumpers of Yugoslavia
Ski jumpers at the 1976 Winter Olympics
Skiers from Ljubljana